Mecodema argentum is a large-bodied (29–32 mm length, 8.5–10 mm width) ground beetle found in the northern region of the Coromandel Range, New Zealand and relatively abundant in the hills above Coromandel town. Mecodema argentum is more closely related to Mecodema species found in Northland, than other species found in the Coromandel Ranges. The entire body is black, but the legs and coxae may be reddish brown, plus M. argentum can be distinguished from other North Island Mecodema by the form of the apical portion of the penis lobe.  

For a full description see Seldon & Buckley 2019.

Natural History 
Further research is required.

References 

argentum
Endemic fauna of New Zealand
Beetles of New Zealand
Beetles described in 2019
Endemic insects of New Zealand